Andrew Joseph Ladd (born December 12, 1985) is a Canadian professional ice hockey winger for the  Arizona Coyotes of the National Hockey League (NHL). He previously played for the Carolina Hurricanes, Chicago Blackhawks, Atlanta Thrashers, Winnipeg Jets and New York Islanders.

Ladd was drafted in 2004 by the Hurricanes and won the Stanley Cup with them in 2006. He won the Stanley Cup for a second time in 2010 with the Blackhawks.

Playing career

Junior career

Ladd began his junior hockey career with the Coquitlam Express. He then progressed to the major junior Western Hockey League (WHL) with the Calgary Hitmen after being traded from the Vancouver Giants in exchange for Jamison Orr. He recorded 75 points in his rookie season, tops among first-year players and 15th in WHL scoring. His +39 plus/minus led the league, earning him the WHL Plus-Minus Award. In the off-season, Ladd was drafted in the first round, fourth overall, by the Carolina Hurricanes in the 2004 NHL Entry Draft.

Professional

Carolina Hurricanes
Ladd turned professional after two seasons with the Hitmen in 2005–06 with the Lowell Lock Monsters, the Hurricanes' American Hockey League (AHL) affiliate. He was called up to the Hurricanes in November, making his NHL debut, but soon suffered a knee injury in December which sidelined him until February. Ladd was assigned back to the Lowell Lock Monsters until March when he was recalled to join the Hurricanes for their playoff run. He contributed 5 points in 17 post-season games helping the Hurricanes to their first Stanley Cup championship. Ladd is also remembered for injuring Edmonton Oilers goaltender Dwayne Roloson in game one of the Stanley Cup Finals.  Due to the injuries sustained in the collision, Roloson was unable to resume play for the remainder of the Stanley Cup Playoffs.

The following season, in 2006–07, Ladd solidified a roster spot with the Hurricanes, but suffered an injury for a second straight season, undergoing an emergency appendectomy on December 14, 2006. He finished the campaign with 21 points in 65 games.

Chicago Blackhawks
In the midst of his third NHL season, Ladd was traded to the Chicago Blackhawks at the trade deadline on February 26, 2008, in exchange for Tuomo Ruutu. By joining the Blackhawks, Ladd was reunited with three former minor hockey teammates, Troy Brouwer, Brent Seabrook and Colin Fraser, who all played together with the Pacific Vipers. In a game against the Detroit Red Wings on March 7, 2010, Ladd scored his first NHL hat trick, though Detroit won the game.

Atlanta Thrashers / Winnipeg Jets
On July 1, 2010, in a salary-cap move, Ladd was traded to the Atlanta Thrashers in exchange for defenceman Ivan Vishnevskiy and Atlanta's second-round choice in the 2011 NHL Entry Draft (used to select Adam Clendening), joining Dustin Byfuglien, Ben Eager and Brent Sopel, who had been traded from the Blackhawks a week earlier. During the 2010–11 season, on November 18, Ladd was named as the captain of the Thrashers, with Byfuglien and Tobias Enström as alternates. Ladd was awarded the team MVP award at the completion of the season. On July 5, 2011, Ladd signed a five-year, US$22 million contract with the franchise, as they became the Winnipeg Jets.

Return to Chicago
In the 2015–16 season, in the final year of his contract and with the Jets out of playoff contention, on February 25, 2016, Ladd was traded back to the Blackhawks (along with Jay Harrison and Matt Fraser) in exchange for Marko Daňo and a 2016 first-round draft pick. Ladd appeared in 19 games for the Blackhawks, where he recorded eight goals and four assists. He generally skated with captain Jonathan Toews on the team's first line. Ladd also played in all seven of the Blackhawks playoff games, tallying one goal and one assist.

New York Islanders
On July 1, 2016, Ladd signed as a free agent to a seven-year, $38.5 million contract with the New York Islanders. Despite hoping to replace the Islanders' losses of Kyle Okposo and Frans Nielsen to free agency, Ladd struggled in his first few games with the Islanders, going his first five games without a point and his first 12 games without a goal. The subpar performance of Ladd and other Islanders players led to the mid-season firing of head coach Jack Capuano on January 17, 2017. At the time of the firing, Ladd had 8 goals and 4 assists in 40 games, but under new head coach Doug Weight, Ladd's performance increased. Ladd scored 15 goals in the next 38 games. He finished the season with 23 goals, 8 assists, and 31 points in 78 games played. On March 26, 2019, it was announced that Ladd, after appearing in 26 games through the season, would miss the remainder of the 2018–19 season due to torn ACL.

On November 14, 2019, Ladd was placed on waivers by the Islanders and was then assigned to the Islanders' AHL affiliate, the Bridgeport Sound Tigers, on November 15. On December 21, 2019, Ladd was recalled to the Islanders to replace injured Islanders winger Cal Clutterbuck.

In January 2021, in preparation for the 2020–21 season, Ladd was re-assigned to directly join the Bridgeport Sound Tigers training camp.

Arizona Coyotes
Following the fifth season of his contract with the Islanders, Ladd's disappointing tenure with the club ended when he was traded to the Arizona Coyotes on July 17, 2021. The Islanders also sent Arizona second-round selections in 2021 and 2022 and a conditional third-round round pick in 2023. He played his 1000th NHL Game on April 20, 2022 Against the Chicago Blackhawks at Gila River Arena.

Prior to the  season, it was announced Ladd failed his physical due to a knee issue and would spend the last year of his contract on the injured reserve.

International play

During his junior career, Ladd played for Team Canada at the 2005 World Junior Championships in Grand Forks, North Dakota where he was joined by former minor hockey and future Chicago Blackhawks teammates Colin Fraser and Brent Seabrook. The trio helped Canada win their first gold medal of a five-year championship run. He was chosen as an alternative captain for team Canada at the 2011 IIHF tournament.

Career statistics

Regular season and playoffs

International

Awards
WHL Plus-Minus Award – 2004
 WHL Top Draft Prospect Award – 2004
World Junior Championships gold medal – 2005
2× Stanley Cup champion – 2006, 2010

References

External links

 

1985 births
Living people
Albany River Rats players
Arizona Coyotes players
Atlanta Thrashers captains
Atlanta Thrashers players
Bridgeport Sound Tigers players
Calgary Hitmen players
Canadian ice hockey left wingers
Carolina Hurricanes draft picks
Carolina Hurricanes players
Chicago Blackhawks players
Ice hockey people from British Columbia
Lowell Lock Monsters players
National Hockey League first-round draft picks
New York Islanders players
People from Maple Ridge, British Columbia
Stanley Cup champions
Vancouver Giants players
Winnipeg Jets players